Kōzō, Kozo, Kouzou or Kohzoh (written: , , , , , , , , , , , , , , ,  or ) is a masculine Japanese given name. Notable people with the name include:

, Japanese footballer
, Japanese shogi player
, Japanese sprinter
, Japanese swimmer
, Japanese footballer
, Japanese politician
, Japanese engineer
, Japanese journalist
, Japanese ski jumper
, Japanese footballer
, Japanese handball player
, Japanese voice actor
, Japanese photographer
, Japanese singer-songwriter
, Japanese television and film director
, Japanese video game composer
, Japanese engineer
, Japanese mass murderer
, Japanese film director
, Japanese politician
, Imperial Japanese Navy admiral
, Japanese voice actor
, Japanese computer scientist
, Japanese kickboxer
, Japanese footballer
, Imperial Japanese Navy admiral
, Japanese economist
Kozo Watanabe (disambiguation), multiple people
, Japanese politician
, Japanese footballer

Japanese masculine given names